The Big One, formerly known as  the Pepsi Max Big One, is a steel roller coaster located at Blackpool Pleasure Beach in Blackpool, Lancashire, United Kingdom. It held the title as the tallest until 1996 when Fujiyama opened in Japan. Constructed at a cost of £12 million, the ride was sponsored by Pepsi Max until 2011, which resulted in the name change and removal of all branding.

History

The Big One's construction began in 1992 by Arrow Dynamics with Ron Toomer as its lead designer, and by the time it was completed, the total cost had reached £12 million. The tubular track and supports were airlifted from Bolton to Blackpool and stored at nearby Blackpool Airport. During the start of the construction of the ride, the south of Blackpool promenade was closed and pieces of the structure were stored on the road adjacent to the Pleasure Beach. The first pieces to be fitted were the large foundations that would follow on from the main supports. Once all the supports were fitted, the tubular track was fitted followed by additional supports on the turnaround and the mid-course brake section.

The roller coaster opened as the Pepsi Max Big One on 28 May 1994. At the time, it was both the tallest and steepest roller coaster in the world. Its height record was surpassed in 1996 by Fujiyama at Fuji-Q Highland in Japan.

The ride maintained its sponsorship from Pepsi Max until 2011 when the branding was removed from the ride. The Pepsi Max ride tunnel shaped like a drink can still remains as part of the ride.

The Big One has been partially re-tracked by Taziker over three recent closed seasons. In 2019-20, four sections of track were replaced in the section which passes through the Big One lift hill. The following year, a further 75m of track was replaced towards the end of the ride. In 2021-22, another 103m of track was replaced, from partway over Star Hill through the Big Dipper and into the mid-course brake.

Statistics
During the three-minute ride, riders experience positive g-forces of up to 3.5g and negative g-forces of up to 0.5g.

Each train has five cars with six passengers per car, for a total of 30 passengers per train. The ride is rated for a maximum capacity of 1,700 riders per hour. The colour scheme for each train is the same: a blue base with two coloured bands around the side and front (red and white) showing the Union Jack logo. Each train is numbered at the back of the fifth car, and each car is numbered according to the back of each section. Before the ride was granted a certificate to operate, Blackpool Pleasure Beach had to appeal to Blackpool Airport located one mile from the park. Due to the ride's height, warning beacons had to be installed on the peaks of the first two hills, including the main drop.

Ride experience
Once riders are seated and secured, a siren sounds and the train exits the station down a small dip, turning 180 degrees straight into a tunnel decorated as a Pepsi Max pop can. After the brief tunnel, the train climbs the lift hill, which has height markers every  showing riders the rising elevation, crossing over Icon's track. As the drop levels out, riders experience up to 3.5G and rise up a large hill with minimal airtime. The track bends slightly right into a large 180-degree, heavily banked left turn followed by three slightly-banked airtime hills. After the third hill, the track crosses under Big Dipper and enters the mid-course brake run, before descending into a downward helix. The finale features an angled decline through Nickelodeon Streak into a tunnel – where the on-ride photo is taken – and a short ascent into the final brake run before returning to the station.

Incidents

In July 1994, during the ride's inaugural season, 26 people were injured when the computerized braking system failed to completely stop a train returning to the station. The train collided with another train parked inside the loading station. A second train collision, also caused by failure to brake, occurred in August 2000 and injured 16 people.

In April 2021, a train ascending the lift hill halted, leaving a number of people stranded near the top of the ride. Park staff had to scale the ride and safely guide riders as they walked down off the ride.

Notes

References

External links
 Pleasure Beach Blackpool, The Big One Official Site

Steel roller coasters
Blackpool Pleasure Beach
Roller coasters in the United Kingdom
PepsiCo buildings and structures
Roller coasters introduced in 1994